Retransmission might refer to:

 Retransmission (data networks), the resending of packets which have been damaged or lost
 Replication of a signal at a repeater
re-broadcast through a rebroadcaster or broadcast translator or booster, or relay station
Retransmission consent, permission for a cable or satellite company to carry a TV station

See also
 Relay (disambiguation)